Pamela Glossop (born 22 September 1954) is an Australian former field hockey player. She competed in the women's tournament at the 1984 Summer Olympics.

References

External links
 

1954 births
Living people
Australian female field hockey players
Olympic field hockey players of Australia
Field hockey players at the 1984 Summer Olympics
Place of birth missing (living people)
20th-century Australian women
21st-century Australian women